The Bahía Portete massacre was a massacre in the Colombian town of Bahía Portete (municipality of Uribia), in the Department of La Guajira on April 16, 2004. It was perpetrated by paramilitary groups of the United Self-Defense Forces of Colombia (AUC) Wayuu Counter-Insurgency Bloc led by alias "Jorge 40" killing 12 people and the disappearance of one. Some 600 people were displaced against their will and took refuge in neighboring Venezuela.

Jorge 40's men, alias "Pablo" and "Chema Bola" shot the indigenous group in Bahia Portete after receiving reports that these were "kidnapping and robbing" in the region. Five member of the Fince-Epinayú family were assassinated, accused of kidnapping a Lebanese immigrant. 

The Spanish newspaper El Mundo reported in 2004 that the motives were rivalries, aroused between paramilitary factions between "Jorge 40" and another paramilitary commander known as "Chema Balas" for the control of the port of Bahía Portete. Calculated the death of 30 members of the Wayuu executed, 60 disappeared and some 250 forcibly displaced into Venezuela. Paramilitaries pertaining to the AUC demobilized in 2006, but new drug trafficking organizations arose, such as the Aguilas Negras. Between 2000 and 2005 the FARC and the AUC perpetrated two massacres each while the ELN perpetrated one in the Department of La Guajira.

See also
The Return (2013 film) by filmmaker Patricia Ortega (Maracaibo, Venezuela) based on the Massacre in Bahía Portete- available at YouTube.com: https://www.youtube.com/watch?v=tAjsmjkJsC8&t=27s
List of massacres in Colombia

References

External links
 
A Visit Home: PBS Filmmakers Report on the 2010 commemoration of the Bahía Portete massacre

April 2004 events in South America
Attacks in 2004
Colombian conflict
Mass murder in 2004
Massacres in Colombia
Massacres in 2004
Spree shootings in Colombia
2004 murders in Colombia